The Commonwealth Telecommunications Organisation (CTO) traces to the British Empire's Pacific Cable Board in 1901, though in its current form, was created by international treaty, the Commonwealth Telegraphs Agreement between Commonwealth Nations signed in London on 11 May 1948.

The CTO connects government and non-government entities to enhance cooperation in information and communication technology (ICT).

The government members of the CTO are:

ICT sector members include Avanti Communications, British Telecom, Facebook, Huawei, Intelsat, PwC London, Safaricom, and Vodafone.

References

See also
Internet Service Providers Association
International Telecommunication Union
List of telecommunications regulatory bodies

Treaties of the United Kingdom
Treaties of Australia
Treaties of Canada
Treaties of New Zealand
Treaties of Ghana
Treaties of Malaysia
Treaties of Zimbabwe
Commonwealth Family
Institutions of the Commonwealth of Nations
Intergovernmental organizations established by treaty